Christopher Rinke (born October 26, 1960 in Port Coquitlam, British Columbia)  is a Canadian wrestler. He won a bronze medal in the Men's Freestyle Middleweight (82 kg) category at the 1984 Summer Olympics.

References

External links
 Athlete Biography at Canadian Olympic Committee
 

1960 births
Olympic wrestlers of Canada
Olympic bronze medalists for Canada
Wrestlers at the 1984 Summer Olympics
Wrestlers at the 1988 Summer Olympics
Canadian male sport wrestlers
Sportspeople from British Columbia
People from Port Coquitlam
Living people
Olympic medalists in wrestling
Commonwealth Games gold medallists for Canada
Wrestlers at the 1982 Commonwealth Games
Wrestlers at the 1986 Commonwealth Games
Medalists at the 1984 Summer Olympics
Pan American Games bronze medalists for Canada
Commonwealth Games medallists in wrestling
Pan American Games medalists in wrestling
Wrestlers at the 1983 Pan American Games
20th-century Canadian people
Medallists at the 1982 Commonwealth Games
Medallists at the 1986 Commonwealth Games